David V. Smith House is located in Elmer, Salem County, New Jersey, United States. The house was built in 1830 and was added to the National Register of Historic Places on May 17, 1976.

See also
National Register of Historic Places listings in Salem County, New Jersey

References

Houses on the National Register of Historic Places in New Jersey
Houses completed in 1830
Houses in Salem County, New Jersey
National Register of Historic Places in Salem County, New Jersey
1830 establishments in New Jersey
New Jersey Register of Historic Places
Elmer, New Jersey